Kadapur  is a village in the southern state of Karnataka, India. It is located in the Chikodi taluk of Belgaum district in Karnataka.

Demographics
 India census, Kadapur had a population of 5151 with 2638 males and 2513 females.

See also
 Belgaum
 Districts of Karnataka

References

External links
 http://Belgaum.nic.in/

{{netaji.s.shinde
.politician}}

Villages in Belagavi district